Windermere Secondary School is a school in Windermere, Cape Town, Western Cape, South Africa.

External links

Schools in Cape Town